The Hungarian Revolution of 1956 (23 October – 4 November 1956), also known as the Hungarian Uprising, was a countrywide revolution against the government of the Hungarian People's Republic (1949–1989) and the policies caused by the government's subordination to the Soviet Union (USSR). The uprising lasted 12 days before being crushed by Soviet tanks and troops on November 4, 1956. Thousands were killed and wounded and nearly a quarter-million Hungarians fled the country.

The Hungarian Revolution began on 23 October 1956 in Budapest when university students appealed to the civil populace to join them at the Hungarian Parliament Building to protest against the USSR's geopolitical domination of Hungary through the Stalinist government of Mátyás Rákosi. A delegation of students entered the building of Magyar Rádió to broadcast their sixteen demands for political and economic reforms to civil society, but were detained by security guards. When the student protestors outside the radio building demanded the release of their delegation, policemen from the ÁVH (State Protection Authority) shot and killed several of them.

Consequently, Hungarians organized into revolutionary militias to fight against the ÁVH; local Hungarian communist leaders and ÁVH policemen were captured and summarily killed or lynched; and political prisoners were released and armed. To realize their political, economic, and social demands, local soviets (councils of workers) assumed control of municipal government from the Hungarian Working People's Party. The new government of Imre Nagy disbanded the ÁVH, declared Hungary's withdrawal from the Warsaw Pact, and pledged to re-establish free elections. By the end of October the intense fighting had subsided.

Although initially willing to negotiate the withdrawal of the Soviet Army from Hungary, the USSR repressed the Hungarian Revolution on 4 November 1956, and fought the Hungarian revolutionaries until 10 November; repression of the Hungarian Uprising killed 2,500 Hungarians and 700 Soviet Army soldiers, and compelled 200,000 Hungarians to seek political refuge abroad.

The pejorative label Tankie was inspired by these events. Within the leftist politics, it is often used to describe contemporary leftists with authoritarian tendencies, especially Stalinists and, sometimes, Maoists or any other branch of Marxism-Leninism.

Background

Second World War
During the Second World War (1939–1945), the Kingdom of Hungary (1920–1946) was a member of the Axis powers – in alliance with Nazi Germany, Fascist Italy, the Kingdom of Romania, and the Kingdom of Bulgaria. In 1941, the Royal Hungarian Army participated in the Nazi invasion of Yugoslavia (6 April 1941) and in Operation Barbarossa (22 June 1941), the invasion of the USSR. In the event, by 1944, the Red Army were en route to the Kingdom of Hungary, after first having repelled the Royal Hungarian Army and the armies of the other Axis Powers from the territory of the USSR.

Fearful of the Red Army's occupation of the Kingdom of Hungary, the royal Hungarian government unsuccessfully sought an armistice with the Allies, to which betrayal of the Axis, the Nazis launched Operation Margarethe (12 March 1944) to establish the Nazi Government of National Unity of Hungary; despite those politico-military efforts, the Red Army defeated the German and the Hungarian Nazis in late 1944. On 10 February 1947, a Paris peace treaty confirmed the military defeat of Nazi Hungary and stipulated the USSR's right to a military occupation of Hungary.

Soviet occupation

At the end of the Second World War (1939–1945), the Kingdom of Hungary was in the geopolitical sphere of influence of the USSR. In the political aftermath of the War, Hungary was a multiparty democracy, in which the 1945 Hungarian parliamentary election produced a coalition government composed of Independent Smallholders, Agrarian Workers and the Civic Party, headed by Prime Minister Zoltán Tildy. Nonetheless, on behalf of the USSR, the Hungarian Communist Party continually used salami tactics to wrest minor political concessions, which continually diminished the political authority of the coalition government – despite the Communist Party only having received 17 percent the votes in the parliamentary election of 1945.

After the election in 1945, control of the State Protection Authority (Államvédelmi Hatóság, ÁVH) was transferred from the Independent Smallholders Party of the coalition government to the Hungarian Communist party. The ÁVH repressed non­­‑communist political opponents with intimidation and false accusations, imprisonment and torture. The brief, four­­‑year period of multi-party democracy ended when the Hungarian Social Democratic Party merged with the Communist Party and became the Hungarian Working People's Party, whose candidate stood unopposed in the 1949 Hungarian parliamentary election. Afterwards, on 20 August 1949, the Hungarian People's Republic was proclaimed and established as a socialist state, with whom the USSR then concorded the COMECON treaty of mutual assistance, which allowed stationing troops of Red Army soldiers in Hungary.

Based upon the economic model of the USSR, the Hungarian Working People's Party established the socialist economy of Hungary with the nationalization of the means of production and of the natural resources of the country. Moreover, by 1955, the relatively free politics of Hungary allowed intellectuals and journalists to freely criticise the social and economic policies of the Rákosi government. In that vein of relative political freedom, on 22 October 1956, students from the Budapest University of Technology and Economics had reestablished the MEFESZ Students' union, which the Rákosi government earlier had banned for their politically incorrect politics.

Stalinist Hungary
Initially, the Hungarian People's Republic was a socialist state headed by the Communist government of Mátyás Rákosi (r. 1947–1956), a Stalinist who was beholden to the USSR. To ensure ideological compliance within his Stalinist government, Rákosi used the ÁVH (State Protection Authority) to purge 7,000 politically incorrect "Titoists" and "Trotskyists" from the Communist Party of Hungary, for being "Western agents" whose participation in the Spanish Civil War (1936–1939) interfered with Stalin's long-term plans for world Communism. Among the Stalinist governments of the Eastern Bloc, the Rákosi government of the Hungarian People's Republic was most repressive of political, sexual, and religious minorities.

In 1949, the Rákosi government arrested, tortured and convicted Cardinal József Mindszenty in a show trial for treason against Hungary, for collaboration with Nazi Germany in the Holocaust in Hungary – the religious persecution of Hungarian Jews, and the political persecutions of Hungarian communists and of Hungarian anti-Nazis.

Political repression
In the 1950–1952 period, the ÁVH forcibly relocated more than 26,000 non-communist Hungarians, and confiscated their housing for members of the Communist Party of Hungary, and so eliminate the political threats posed by the nationalist and anti-communist intelligentsias and by the local bourgeoisie. According to their particular politics, anti-communist Hungarians were either imprisoned in concentration camps or were deported to the USSR or were killed, either summarily or after a show trial; the victims included the communist politician László Rajk, the minister of the interior who established the ÁVH secret police.

The Rákosi government politicised the education system with a toiling intelligentsia who would assist in the Russification of Hungary; thus the study of Russian language and communist political instruction were mandatory at school and at university; religious schools were nationalized and church leaders replaced with communist officials.

Economic decline
In the early 1950s, the Rákosi government's socialist economics increased the per capita income of the Hungarian people, yet their standard of living diminished because of the compulsory financial contributions towards the industrialisation of Hungary, which reduced the disposable and discretionary income of individual Hungarian workers. That poor economy was further diminished by the bureaucratic mismanagement of resources, which caused shortages of supplies, and the consequent rationing of bread and sugar, flour and meat, et cetera. The net result of those economic conditions, was that the Hungarian workers' disposable income in 1952 was two-thirds of the disposable income of Hungarian workers in 1938.

Besides paying for the Red Army occupation of socialist Hungary, the Hungarians also paid war reparations (US$300 million) to the USSR, to the Czechoslovak Socialist Republic, and to the Socialist Federal Republic of Yugoslavia. In 1946, the Hungarian National Bank reported that the cost of war reparations was "between 19 and 22 per cent of the annual national income" of Hungary, an onerous national expense aggravated by the hyperinflation consequent to the post-war depreciation of the Hungarian pengő. Moreover, participation in the Soviet-sponsored Council of Mutual Economic Assistance (COMECON) prevented direct trade with the countries of the West, and also prevented the Hungarian People's Republic from receiving American financial aid through the Marshall Plan (1948). Socially, the imposition of Soviet-style economic policies and the payment of war reparations angered the peoples of Hungary, whilst the cumulative effects of economic austerity fuelled anti-Soviet political discontent as the payment of foreign debt took precedence over the material needs of the Hungarian people.

International events

De–Stalinization
On 5 March 1953, the death of Stalin allowed the Communist Party of the Soviet Union (CPSU) to proceed with the de-Stalinization of the USSR, which was a relative liberalisation of politics that afterwards allowed most European communist parties and the communist parties of the Warsaw Pact to develop a reformist wing – within the structures of the Philosophy of Marxism and orders from Moscow. Hence, the reformist communist Imre Nagy became prime minister (1953–55) of the Hungarian People's Republic, in replacement of the Stalinist Mátyás Rákosi (1946–56), whose heavy-hand style of communist government had proved counter-productive to the interests of the USSR in Hungary.

Despite not being prime minister of Hungary, Rákosi remained politically powerful as the General Secretary of the Hungarian Communist Party, and so undermined many of the Nagy government's political and socio-economic reforms; by 18 April 1955 Rákosi had so discredited Nagy that the USSR deposed Nagy as head-of-state of Socialist Hungary. Three months of plotting and conspiring rid Rákosi and the Hungarian Communist Party of Imre Nagy, who was reduced to a political non-person. On 14 April Prime Minister Imre Nagy was stripped of his Hungarian Communist Party offices and functions, and was sacked as prime minister on 18 April. Despite having been out of political favour with the USSR since January 1955, Nagy had refused to perform the requisite communist penance of 'self criticism', and refused to resign as PM of Hungary.

In February 1956, as the First Secretary of the CPSU, Nikita Khrushchev initiated the de-Stalinization of the USSR with the speech On the Personality Cult and its Consequences, which catalogued and denounced the abuses of power committed by Josef Stalin and his inner-circle protégés, in Russia and abroad. Therefore, the de-Stalinization of Hungarian People's Republic featured Rákosi's dismissal as General Secretary of the Communist Party of Hungary, and his replacement by Ernő Gerő, on 18 July 1956.

From the Western perspective, the countries of western Europe co-operated with the CIA's propaganda radio network, Radio Free Europe, to broadcast the speech On the Personality Cult and its Consequences to the countries of eastern Europe, expecting that, as Secretary of the CPSU, Khrushchev's anti–Stalinist speech would substantively contribute to the destabilisation of the internal politics of the Warsaw Pact countries.

Warsaw Pact established
On 14 May 1955, with the Treaty of Friendship, Cooperation and Mutual Assistance, the USSR established the Warsaw Pact with seven countries of the Eastern Bloc, including the Hungarian People's Republic. The geopolitical principles of the Warsaw Pact defence treaty included "respect for the independence and [the] sovereignty of [the member] states" and the practise of "non-interference in their internal affairs". Then, on 15 May 1955, a day after the USSR established the Warsaw Pact, the Austrian State Treaty established Austria as a neutral country in the geopolitical cold war between the US and the USSR. Austria's declaration of geopolitical neutrality allowed the Communist government of PM Nagy to publicly consider "the possibility of Hungary adopting a neutral status on the Austrian pattern".

In June 1956, the Polish Army violently repressed the workers' uprising at Poznań against the economic policies of the Polish People's Republic. In October, the Polish government appointed the politically rehabilitated, reform communist Władysław Gomułka as First Secretary of the Polish United Workers' Party to deal with the USSR, and, by 19 October 1956, Gomułka had successfully negotiated greater trade agreements and fewer Red Army troops stationed in Poland. The USSR's concessions to Poland – known as the Polish October – emboldened Hungarians to demand from the USSR like concessions for the Hungarian People's Republic, which much contributed to the Hungarians' greatly idealistic politics in October 1956.

Uprising and Revolution

Political discontent

On 13 October 1956, a group of 12 students from the university faculties in Szeged met to play cards, and snubbed the DISZ, the official communist student union, by re-establishing the MEFESZ (Union of Hungarian University and Academy Students), the democratic student union banned by the Stalinist Rákosi government. The MEFESZ students distributed hand-written notes in classrooms to inform faculty and students of the time and place for the meeting on 16 October 1956. A professor of law was chairman of committee who formally reestablished the MEFESZ student union, with the proclamation and publication of a twenty-demand manifesto, ten demands about the MEFESZ, and ten anti-Soviet demands, e.g. free elections and the departure of Soviet troops from Hungary, etc.; days later, the university students at Pécs, Miskolc, and Sopron followed suit.

On 22 October, at the Budapest University of Technology and Economics, one of the law students from the original group of twelve students, announced that the MEFESZ student union was again politically active, and then proclaimed the Sixteen Political, Economic, and Ideological Points against the USSR's geopolitical hegemony upon Hungary. The Hungarian Writers' Union ceremoniously proclaimed Hungary's anti-Soviet political solidarity with anti-communist reformers in Poland when they laid a commemorative wreath at the statue of the Polish hero Gen. Józef Zachariasz Bem who also was a hero of the Hungarian Revolution of 1848; likewise, the MEFESZ student union held a parallel demonstration of Hungarians' political solidarity with the Poles.

Initiating gunfire
In the afternoon of 23 October 1956, approximately 20,000 protestors met beside the statue of General József Bem, a national hero of Poland and Hungary. To the amassed crowd of protestors, the intellectual Péter Veres, the president of the Writers' Union (Írószövetség), read a manifesto demanding Hungarian independence from all foreign powers; a democratic socialist political system based upon land reform and (public) state ownership in the economy; Hungarian membership to the United Nations; and all freedoms and rights for the citizens of Hungary. After Veres proclaimed the manifesto demanding Hungarian sovereignty, the crowd chanted the Hungarian patriotic poem National Song (Nemzeti dal), which the Soviet-controlled Rákosi government of Hungary had banned from public performance; the crowd repeatedly chanted the refrain: "This we swear, this we swear, that we will no longer be slaves."

At 20:00 hrs, the first secretary of the Hungarian Working People's Party, Ernő Gerő broadcast a hardline speech condemning the political demands of the intelligentsia and of the university students. Angered by Gerő's rejection, some protestors realised one of their demands, and demolished the Stalin Monument in Budapest, which had been erected in place of a razed church, in 1951; and, by 21:30 hrs – an hour and a half later – the nationalist and anti-communist protestors had destroyed the eight-metre-tall statue of Josef Stalin.

Also at 20:00 hrs, a crowd of nationalist and anti-communist protestors had gathered outside the Magyar Rádió building, which was guarded by the ÁVH secret police. Violence soon occurred between the sides when the protestors heard rumours of the arrest and detainment of a delegation of students who had entered the radio station in effort to broadcast their political demands to the entire country. The situation escalated after protestors heard rumours that the ÁVH had killed their delegation of comrades sent to broadcast the anti–Soviet message. In response, from the windows of the building, the ÁVH threw tear gas grenades at and fired upon the many anti-communist and nationalist protestors assembled outside the Magyar Rádió building, and soon required resupply and reinforcement.

In suppressing the Hungarians' anti-government protestations, the ÁVH smuggled weapons and ammunition in an ambulance for delivery to them at the Magyar Rádió building, but the protestors hijacked the ambulance and the weapons for themselves. The Hungarian Army sent soldiers to support the ÁVH policemen defending the Magyar Rádió building, but some of the soldiers tore off the red-star insignia on their caps and joined the side of the anti-government protestors. ÁVH policemen used guns and tear gas, while the protestors set police cars afire and distributed weapons captured from the military and police forces, and acted on their anti–Soviet politics by destroying the symbols of Russian communism in Hungary.

Deposing the communist government
On 23 October 1956, the Secretary of the Hungarian Working People's Party, Ernő Gerő, asked for the USSR's military intervention in order "to suppress a demonstration that was reaching an ever-greater and unprecedented scale", which threatens the national security of the Hungarian People's Republic. To that end, the USSR already had planned the invasion and occupation of Hungary, and the political purging of Hungarian society. At 02.00 hrs., on 24 October 1956, Soviet defence minister Georgy Zhukov ordered the Red Army to occupy Budapest – the capital city of a Warsaw Pact country.

By 12.00 hrs of 24 October, Red Army tanks were stationed outside the parliament building, and Red Army soldiers held the bridges and crossroads that controlled access to Budapest, while Hungarian revolutionaries barricaded streets to defend their city from the Red Army. Also on that day, Imre Nagy became prime minister in place of András Hegedüs. In a national radio broadcast, PM Nagy asked a ceasefire between the Red Army and the Hungarian Revolutionaries, and agreed to initiate postponed political reforms decided in 1953. Despite the pleas of PM Nagy, groups of revolutionaries in Budapest armed themselves and continually fought the Red Army.

At the offices of the communist newspaper Szabad Nép, the ÁVH guards fired upon unarmed protestors; in turn, anti-communists attacked and drove out the ÁVH policemen from the newspaper building. The Hungarian revolutionaries then avenged themselves against the ÁVH policemen. On 25 October, a crowd gathered in Kossuth Square in front of the Hungarian parliament building, which was a mixed group of civilian demonstrators including women, children, and elderly. Most of them came from the mass demonstration outside the Astoria, accompanied by three Soviet tanks, which the demonstrators climbed on, fraternising with the crews. At the same time a column of Soviet tanks carrying two delegates of the Communist Party of the Soviet Union (CPSU) sent to Hungary, Politburo members Anastas Mikoyan and Mikhail Suslov, as well as KGB Chairman Ivan Serov and Mikhail Malinin, commander-in-chief of the Soviet forces in Hungary were on their way to the headquarters of the Hungarian Workers' Party (MDP) on Akadémia Street, where they were to attend a meeting of the Central Executive Committee (CEC), which was to begin at 10 a.m. Under pressure from the Soviet delegates, the CEC relieved Ernő Gerő of his position as party leader and elected János Kádár in his place. Meanwhile, the crowd demonstrating at Kossuth Square elected a delegation to deliver their demands in the Parliament, but government guards and a company of the Ministry of Defence's armoured regiment, backed by seven Soviet T-54 tanks lined up in front of the Parliament, kept the demonstrators away from the building. The events at Astoria were repeated, with demonstrators trying to make friends with the Soviet soldiers, handing out bilingual leaflets and some climbing on top of the guard tanks. At a few minutes after 11 a.m., General Serov decided to inspect the situation on Kossuth Square, accompanied by several Soviet and Hungarian officers and a tank. Seeing several Soviet soldiers fraternising with the demonstrators, Serov ordered the firing of warning shots, which caused a mass panic on the square. In the ensuing confusion, the Soviet tanks lined up in front of the Parliament building responded by targeting the buildings on the other side of the square. Another Soviet tank coming from a nearby street fired aimed shots at the demonstrators trying to take cover. This action claimed the most lives. The number of the dead is still disputed, with estimates ranging from 75 to 1000.

According to another version of the events, which already appeared during the revolution, but still unproven, the ÁVH policemen and/or communist partisans fired into the assembled protestors from the roof of the building of the Agricultural Ministry. In the fog of war, some Red Army soldiers mistakenly returned the fire towards the roof, having mistakenly believed themselves the targets. The Hungarian revolutionaries armed themselves with weapons captured from ÁVH policemen and with weapons donated by anti-communist soldiers who had deserted the Hungarian Army for the Hungarian Revolution against the USSR; from amongst the crowd outside the parliament, the armed revolutionaries shot at the roof-top ÁVH policemen.

Meanwhile, nationalist and anti-communist loyalties had fractured the chain of command of the Hungarian Army in response to the communist government's order to militarily repress the popular demonstrations against the Soviet control of Hungary. The Hungarian Army units in Budapest and in the countryside remained uninvolved in the Revolution, because local commanders avoided politics in order to avoid repressing the revolutionaries. Order was restored in the 24–29 October period after the Hungarian Army had fought 71 firefights with the nationalist and with the anti-communist revolutionaries in fifty communities. On 26 October, in the town of Kecskemét, outside the office of State Security and the local jail, Hungarian Army's Third Corps, led by Major General Lajos Gyurkó, shot seven anti-communist protestors and arrested the organizers of the anti-Soviet protest. On Gyurkó's order Hungarian Air Force fighter planes shot up demonstrators with cannon fire in various towns (see :hu:Tiszakécskei_sortűz), earning the praise of János Kádár after the defeat of the "counter-revolution" as "the only division commander who, at the call of the party organisation, swept the Danube-Tisza Interfluve six times, smashing everything".

As Hungarian revolutionaries fought the soldiers and tanks of the Red Army with small arms and Molotov cocktails in the streets of Budapest, throughout Hungary, revolutionary workers' councils assumed government power and called general strikes to halt the economy and the functioning of civil society. In ridding Hungary of the influence of and control from the USSR, the revolutionaries destroyed the symbols of Communism, such as the red star and Red Army monuments, and burned communist literature. Moreover, Revolutionary militias, such as the 400-man militia led by József Dudás attacked and murdered pro-Soviet Hungarians and ÁVH policemen. The Hungarian Army armoured division stationed in Budapest, commanded by Pál Maléter led the Hungarian Revolution against the USSR's control of Hungary, and negotiated ceasefire agreements with the revolutionaries; nonetheless, the Hungarian Revolution took many communist prisoners who were registered to lists that identified the prisoner either for summary execution or as an enemy of the people.

In the Csepel area of Budapest, 250 communists defended the Csepel Iron and Steel Works, and, on 27 October, the Hungarian Army restored order in Csepel; two days later, the Hungarian Revolutionaries recaptured Csepel after the Hungarian Army's withdrawal on 29 October. In the Angyalföld area of Budapest, the communists and 350 armed workers and 380 communist soldiers defended the Láng factory. Anti-fascist Hungarian veterans of the Second World War participated in recapturing the offices of the Szabad Nép communist newspaper. At the town of Szarvas, armed guards defended the Hungarian Communist Party and the communist government of Hungary. In the event, the Revolutionaries' successful attacks upon the Parliament collapsed the communist government of Hungary; and First Secretary Ernő Gerő and ex-PM András Hegedüs fled Hungary to the USSR; Imre Nagy became prime minister, and János Kádár became the first secretary of the Hungarian Communist Party.

The Nagy government freed the political prisoner General Béla Király to restore order to Hungary with a National Guard force composed of policemen, soldiers, and Revolutionaries loyal to Hungary. On 30 October 1956, Gen. Király's National Guard attacked the building of the Central Committee of the Hungarian Communist Party and killed every pro-Soviet officer of the Hungarian Communist Party, ÁVH policeman, and pro-Soviet Hungarian soldier they encountered; and most Red Army troops withdrew from Budapest to garrisons in the Hungarian countryside.

Interlude
Fighting ceased between 28 October and 4 November, as many Hungarians believed that Soviet military units were withdrawing from Hungary. According to post-revolution communist sources, there were approximately 213 Hungarian Working People's Party members lynched or executed during the period.

New government

The new communist government of Prime Minister Imre Nagy was surprised by the rapidity with which the Hungarian Revolution extended from the streets of Budapest to all of Hungary, and the consequent collapse of the old Gerő–Hegedüs communist government. As head of government, PM Nagy asked every Hungarian to exercise political forbearance in order to restore civil order to Hungary. As the only Communist Hungarian leader with political credibility among Hungarians, the political actions of the Nagy government allowed the USSR to view the Hungarians' anti-Soviet protests as a popular uprising, rather than as an anti-communist counter-revolution. On 28 October 1956, the Nagy Communist government announced the ceasefire among the nationalist, the anti-communist, and the Communist Hungarians, and that, to resolve the national crisis, PM Nagy would:
 consider the revolt as a "great, national and democratic event", and not an anti-communist counter-revolution
 effect an unconditional ceasefire and grant political amnesty for the revolutionaries
 negotiate with the revolutionaries
 disband the ÁVH security police
 establish a national guard for Hungary
 arrange the immediate withdrawal of the Red Army from Budapest and from Hungary 

On 1 November, the Nagy government formally declared Hungary's withdrawal from the Warsaw Pact and Hungary's international status as a politically non-aligned country. Because of being in power for only ten days, the National Government did not explain their policies in detail; however, contemporary newspaper editorials stressed that Hungary should be a multiparty social democracy uninvolved in the Russo–American Cold War. About 8000 political prisoners were released, most notably Cardinal József Mindszenty. Banned political parties, such as the Independent Smallholders and the National Peasant Party ("Petőfi Party"), reappeared to join the coalition.

In 1,170 communities in Hungary, there were 348 cases of revolutionary councils dismissing the local administrators; 312 cases of revolutionary councils sacking the bosses; and 215 cases of the locals burning the communist administrative records of their communities. In 681 communities, anti-communist and nationalist Hungarians damaged and destroyed symbols of the hegemony of the USSR, such as the Red Star, and statues of Josef Stalin and of Lenin; 393 communities damaged Soviet war memorials; and 122 communities burned the books of Marx, Lenin, and Stalin.

Local revolutionary councils formed throughout Hungary, generally without involvement from the preoccupied National Government in Budapest, and assumed various responsibilities of local government from the defunct Communist party. By , the councils had been officially sanctioned by the Hungarian Working People's Party, and the Nagy government asked for their support as "autonomous, democratic local organs formed during the Revolution". Likewise, workers' councils were established at industrial plants and mines, and many unpopular regulations such as production norms were eliminated. The workers' councils strove to manage the enterprise while protecting workers' interests, establishing a socialist economy free of rigid party control. Local control by the councils was not always bloodless; in Debrecen, Győr, Sopron, Mosonmagyaróvár and other cities, crowds of demonstrators were fired upon by the ÁVH, with many lives lost. The ÁVH were disarmed, often by force, in many cases assisted by the local police.

In total, there were approximately 2,100 local revolutionary and workers councils with over 28,000 members. The councils held a combined conference in Budapest that decided to end the nationwide labour strikes and to resume work on 5 November, with the more important councils sending delegates to the Parliament to assure the Nagy government of their support.

Soviet perspective
On 24 October 1956, the Politburo of the USSR discussed how to resolve the political revolts that had occurred in Warsaw Pact countries, specifically the Polish October and the Hungarian Revolt. Led by Vyacheslav Molotov, the hardline faction of the CPSU voted for military intervention, but were opposed by Khrushchev and Marshal Georgy Zhukov who sought a political resolution to the Hungarian revolt. In Budapest, the Soviet delegation reported to Moscow that the Hungarian political situation was less confrontational than reported during the revolt proper. In pursuit of political resolution, Khrushchev said that Ernő Gerő's 23 October request for Soviet intervention indicated that the Hungarian Communist Party retained the confidence of the Hungarian people, because the Hungarians were protesting unresolved socio-economic problems, not ideology. Meanwhile, in the West, the concurrent Suez Crisis (29 October – 7 November 1956) of the French and the British empires' seizure of the Suez Canal from Egypt voided the political possibility of Western military intervention to Hungary. On 28 October, Khrushchev said that Soviet military intervention to Hungary would be a mistaken imitation of the Anglo–French intervention to Egypt.

In Russia, on 30 October 1956, the Presidium of the CPSU decided to not depose the new Hungarian government. Marshal Zhukov said: "We should withdraw troops from Budapest, and, if necessary, withdraw from Hungary, as a whole. This is a lesson for us in the military-political sphere". The Presidium then adopted and published the Declaration of the Government of the USSR on the Principles of Development and Further Strengthening of Friendship and Cooperation between the Soviet Union and other Socialist States, which said that "The Soviet Government is prepared to enter into the appropriate negotiations with the government of the Hungarian People's Republic, and [with] other members of the Warsaw Treaty, on the question of the presence of Soviet troops in the territory of Hungary."

In Hungary, on 30 October, consequent to hearing rumours of that the secret police had anti-communist prisoners, and rumours of the ÁVH shooting anti-communist demonstrators in the city of Mosonmagyaróvár armed protestors attacked the ÁVH detachment guarding the headquarters building of the Hungarian Working People's Party in Köztársaság tér (Republic Square), in Budapest. The anti-communists killed more than 20 ÁVH officers and ÁVH conscripts; the head of the Budapest party committee, Imre Mező, also was killed. Within hours, news reportage and filmed scenes of the Hungarian anti-communist revolt that occurred in Republic Square were broadcast in the USSR; and the CPSU made propaganda of the images of the communist victims of the Hungarian Revolt. The leaders of the Hungarian Revolution condemned the attack upon the ÁVH headquarters and asked the protestors to cease and desist from mob violence.

On 30 October, at Budapest, Anastas Mikoyan and Mikhail Suslov spoke with Prime Minister Imre Nagy who told them that Hungarian geopolitical neutrality was a long-term political objective for the Hungarian People's Republic, which he wanted to discuss with the presidium of the CPSU. Khrushchev considered the geopolitical options for the USSR's resolving the Hungarian anti-communist revolution, but Nagy's declaration of Hungarian neutrality decided his dispatching the Red Army into Hungary. The USSR invaded the Hungarian People's Republic, because:
 Simultaneous political movements towards multi-party, parliamentary democracy, and a democratic national council of workers might "lead towards a capitalist state" in Hungary and Poland, each movement challenged the authority of communist parties in eastern Europe.
 The militarists in the CPSU would not understand the USSR's failure to intervene in Hungary. That de-Stalinisation had alienated the hardline members of the CPSU, for whom anti-communist protests threatened Soviet hegemony in eastern Europe. That the workers' uprising in East Germany (17 June 1953) – the repression of which killed 84 protestors and produced 700 anti-communist prisoners – required a new Communist government for the German Democratic Republic. That the workers' protests at Poznań (June 1956) – the repression of which killed 57–78 anti-communist protestors – created the Polish October movement, which installed a Polish Communist government less dependent on orders from Moscow.
 Hungarian geopolitical neutrality and withdrawal from the Warsaw Pact breached the buffer zone of satellite states by which the USSR protected themselves from invasion.

In the People's Republic of Hungary, the anti-communist militants concluded that "the [Hungarian Communist] Party is the incarnation of bureaucratic despotism" and that "socialism can develop only on the foundations of direct democracy." For the anti-communists, the struggle of the Hungarian workers was "for the principle of direct democracy" and that "all power should be transferred to the Workers Committees of Hungary." In response, the Presidium broke the de facto ceasefire and repressed the Hungarian Revolution. The Soviet Union's plan was to declare a "Provisional Revolutionary Government" led by János Kádár, who would appeal for Soviet assistance to restore order to Hungary. Kádár was in Moscow in early November, and was in communication with the Soviet embassy whilst still a member of the Nagy government. The USSR sent diplomatic delegations to other communist governments in Eastern Europe and to the People's Republic of China in effort to avoid misunderstandings that might provoke to regional conflicts, and broadcast propaganda explaining their second Soviet intervention to Hungary. The Soviet diplomats disguised their intentions by engaging the Nagy government in talks about withdrawing the Red Army from Hungary.

Moreover, Mao Zedong influenced Khrushchev's decision to repress the Hungarian uprising. The deputy chairman of the Chinese Communist Party, Liu Shaoqi, pressed Khrushchev to militarily repress the Hungarian Revolution. Although Sino–Soviet relations were unstable, the opinion of Mao carried great weight among the members of the Presidium of the CPSU. Initially, Mao opposed a second intervention, which was communicated to Khrushchev on 30 October, before the Presidium met and decided against a Hungarian intervention; later, Mao changed his mind and supported intervention to Hungary.

In the 1–3 November 1956 period, Khrushchev informed the USSR's Warsaw Pact allies of his decision to repress the Hungarian Revolution. Khrushchev met with the Polish communist politician Władysław Gomułka in Brest, Belarus; and then spoke with the Romanian, Czechoslovak, and Bulgarian leaders in Bucharest, Romania. Finally, Khrushchev went to the Socialist Federal Republic of Yugoslavia and spoke with Tito (Josip Broz) who persuaded Khrushchev to install János Kádár as the new leader of the People's Republic of Hungary, instead of Ferenc Münnich. Two months after the USSR repressed the Hungarian Revolution, Tito told Nikolai Firiubin, the Soviet ambassador to Yugoslavia, that "[political] reaction raised its head, especially in Croatia, where the reactionary elements openly incited the employees of the Yugoslav security organs to violence."

Polish response 

The events in Hungary were met with a spontaneous reaction in Poland. Hungarian flags were displayed in many Polish towns and villages. After the Soviet invasion, the help given by the ordinary Poles to Hungarians took on a considerable scale. Citizen organizations and self-acting aid committees were established throughout Poland to distribute aid to the Hungarian population, e.g. the Social Civic Committee of Creative Associations (Bydgoszcz), the Student Committee for Aid to Hungarians (Kraków), the Society of Friends of Hungarians (Tarnów), the Committee to Aid the Hungarians (Lublin), and the Committee for Aid to Hungarians (Człuchów). In addition to the official support coordinated by the Polish Red Cross, one convoy was dispatched – one organized by the Student Aid Committee for Hungarians from Kraków. Other such initiatives were prevented.

By 12 November, over 11,000 honorary blood donors had registered throughout Poland. Polish Red Cross statistics show that by air transport alone (15 aircraft), 44 tonnes of medication, blood, and other medical supplies were delivered to Hungary. Assistance sent using road and rail transport was much higher. Polish aid is estimated at a value of approximately US$2 million in 1956 dollars.

International perspective

On 24 October 1956, U.S. Secretary of State John Foster Dulles (r. 1953–1959) recommended that the United Nations Security Council convene to discuss the USSR's invasion and occupation of the Hungarian People's Republic, without decisive result, because, despite the Protocol of Sèvres (22–24 October 1956), the Anglo–French intervention to Egyptian politics – the Suez Crisis caused by Britain and France seizing the Egyptian Suez Canal – prevented the West from criticizing the imperialism of the USSR; the U.S.   said that: "We couldn't, on one hand, complain about the Soviets intervening in Hungary, and, on the other hand, approve of the British and the French picking that particular time to intervene against [Gamal Abdel] Nasser." Despite earlier demands for the rollback of communism and of the leftist liberation of eastern Europe, Dulles told the USSR that: "We do not see these states [Hungary and Poland] as potential military allies."

On 4 November 1956, the USSR vetoed the Security Council's resolution criticising the USSR's invasion of Hungary, and, in its stead, passed United Nations Security Council Resolution 120, which charged the General Assembly to demand that the USSR withdraw the Red Army from Hungary. Despite 50 votes for withdrawal, 8 votes against withdrawal, and 15 abstentions from the matter, the communist Kádár government of Hungary rejected the presence of UN observers in the Hungarian People's Republic.

In the U.S., two facts determined the inaction of the Eisenhower government: (i) the U.S. Army study, Hungary, Resistance Activities and Potentials (January 1956), which recommended against U.S. military intervention to Hungary on the side of the Hungarian revolutionists; and (ii) the secret warfare of the National Security Council that encouraged anti-communist political discontent in the Eastern Bloc only through psychological warfare, sabotage, and economic warfare.

According to A. Ross Johnson in the International Journal of Intelligence and CounterIntelligence: "Contrary to allegations that continue to this day, RFE Hungarian broadcasts did not foment revolution, urge Hungarians to fight the Soviets, or promise Western assistance. They did criticize would-be reform leader Imre Nagy in personally vituperative terms and contained emotional bombast that Hungarian listeners could easily have interpreted as indicating Western solidarity and support." After the USSR defeated the anti-communist Hungarian Revolution, the revolutionists criticised the CIA and its RFE network for having deceived the Hungarians into believing that the West—NATO and the US—would expel the USSR from the Hungarian People's Republic. Although incitements to violence were officially against RFE policy, an internal analysis by RFE adviser William Griffith found, as summarized by the National Security Archive at George Washington University, that "RFE broadcasts in several cases had implied that foreign aid would be forthcoming if the Hungarians succeeded in establishing a 'central military command'" and "appealed to the Hungarians to 'continue to fight vigorously'". Griffith himself wrote that "There were relatively few real policy violations"—specifically four out of more than 300 broadcasts under review—but conceded that "summaries often failed to reflect the content of the program as it was finally written (this is not the case only with programs where policy violation occurred; the summaries during the period under review in many other cases proved to be very inaccurate descriptions of the programs finally produced)." László Borhi, writing in the Journal of Cold War Studies, states that the RFE broadcasts sanctioned by CIA official Cord Meyer were often "incautious, even reckless" and undermined parallel efforts by the Eisenhower administration to negotiate Hungarian independence in a framework similar to Finlandization: "These contradictory policies sabotaged the overall approach. The harder the insurgents fought, the less chance there was for a negotiated settlement. But the unwillingness of the United States to counter Soviet military action meant that the Hungarian quest for liberation was suicidal."

In 1998, the Hungarian ambassador Géza Jeszenszky criticised Western inaction in 1956 as disingenuous, recalling that the political influence of the United Nations readily applied to resolving the Korean War (1950–1953). Moreover, the study Hungary, 1956: Reviving the Debate over U.S. (In)action During the Revolution confirms that the Eisenhower government did not intervene to the Hungarian Revolution – which occurred in the Soviet sphere of influence – because the USSR would have responded with a nuclear war.

Soviet invasion 

On 1 November, Imre Nagy received reports that Soviet forces had entered Hungary from the east and were moving towards Budapest. Nagy sought and received assurances, which proved to be false, from Soviet Ambassador Yuri Andropov that the Soviet Union would not invade. The Cabinet, with János Kádár in agreement, declared Hungary's neutrality, withdrew from the Warsaw Pact and requested assistance from the diplomatic corps in Budapest and Dag Hammarskjöld, UN Secretary-General, to defend Hungary's neutrality. Andropov was asked to inform his government that Hungary would begin negotiations on the removal of Soviet forces immediately.

On 3 November, a Hungarian delegation led by Defence Minister Pál Maléter was invited to attend negotiations on Soviet withdrawal at the Soviet Military Command at Tököl, near Budapest. At around midnight that evening, General Ivan Serov, Chief of the Soviet Security Police (KGB) ordered the arrest of the Hungarian delegation, and the next day, the Soviet army again attacked Budapest.

The second Soviet intervention, codenamed "Operation Whirlwind", was launched by Marshal Ivan Konev. The five Soviet divisions stationed in Hungary before 23 October were reinforced; Soviet forces soon reached a total strength of 17 divisions. The 8th Mechanized Army under command of Lieutenant General Hamazasp Babadzhanian and the 38th Army under Lieutenant General Hadzhi-Umar Mamsurov from the nearby Carpathian Military District were deployed to Hungary for the operation. Some rank-and-file Soviet soldiers reportedly believed they were being sent to East Berlin to fight German fascists. By 21:30 on 3 November, the Soviet Army had completely encircled Budapest.

At 03:00 on 4 November, Soviet tanks penetrated Budapest along the Pest side of the Danube in two thrusts: one up the Soroksári road from the south and the other down the Váci road from the north. Thus, before a single shot was fired, the Soviets had effectively split the city into two, controlled all bridgeheads and were shielded to the rear by the wide Danube River. Armoured units crossed into Buda and, at 04:25, fired the first shots at the army barracks on Budaörsi Road. Soon, Soviet artillery and tank fire were heard in all of the districts of Budapest. Operation Whirlwind combined air strikes, artillery, and the co-ordinated tank–infantry action of 17 divisions. The Soviet army deployed T-34-85 medium tanks as well as the new T-54s, heavy IS-3 tanks, 152mm ISU-152 mobile assault guns and open-top BTR-152 armored personnel carriers.

Between 4 and 9 November, the Hungarian Army put up sporadic and disorganised resistance, with Zhukov reporting the disarming of twelve divisions, two armoured regiments and the entire Hungarian Air Force. Hungarian fighters continued their most formidable resistance in various districts of Budapest (most famously the Battle of the Corvin Passage), in and around the city of Pécs in the Mecsek Mountains, and in the industrial centre of Dunaújváros (then called Sztálinváros). There were ten to fifteen thousand resistance fighters fighting in Budapest, with the heaviest fighting occurring in the working-class stronghold of Csepel on the Danube River. Although some very senior officers were openly pro-Soviet, rank-and-file soldiers were overwhelmingly loyal to the revolution and either fought the invasion or deserted. The UN reported that there were no recorded incidents of Hungarian Army units fighting for the Soviets.

At 05:20 on 4 November, Imre Nagy broadcast his final plea to the nation and the world, announcing that Soviet forces were attacking Budapest and that the government was remaining at its post. The radio station, Free Kossuth Rádió, stopped broadcasting at 08:07. An emergency Cabinet meeting was held in the Parliament but was attended by only three ministers. As Soviet troops arrived to occupy the building, a negotiated evacuation ensued, leaving Minister of State István Bibó as the last representative of the National Government remaining at his post. He wrote For Freedom and Truth, a stirring proclamation to the nation and the world.

At 06:00, 4 November, in the town of Szolnok, János Kádár proclaimed the "Hungarian Revolutionary Worker-Peasant Government". His statement declared: "We must put an end to the excesses of the counter-revolutionary elements. The hour for action has sounded. We are going to defend the interest of the workers and peasants and the achievements of the people's democracy."

Later that evening, Kádár called upon "the faithful fighters of the true cause of socialism" to come out of hiding and take up arms. But Hungarian support did not materialise, and fighting did not take the form of a civil war, but rather, in the words of a United Nations report, that of "a well-equipped foreign army crushing by overwhelming force a national movement and eliminating the Government".

By 08:00, organised defence of the city evaporated after the radio station had been seized, and many defenders fell back to fortified positions. Between 08:00 and 09:00, the parliamentary guard laid down its arms, and forces under Major General Kuzma Grebennik captured Parliament and liberated captured ministers of the Rákosi–Hegedüs government. Among the liberated were István Dobi and Sándor Rónai, both of whom became members of the re-established socialist Hungarian government. As Soviet troops also came under attack in civilian quarters, they were unable to differentiate military from civilian targets. For that reason, Soviet tanks often crept along main roads and fired indiscriminately into buildings. Hungarian resistance was strongest in the industrial areas of Budapest, with Csepel heavily targeted by Soviet artillery and air strikes.

The last holdouts against the Soviet assault were located in Csepel and in Dunaújváros, where fighting lasted until 11 November, before insurgents finally succumbed to the Soviets. When the fighting ended, Hungarian casualties totalled approximately 2,500 dead and 20,000 wounded. Budapest bore the brunt of the bloodshed, with 1,569 civilians killed. Approximately 53% of the dead were workers; half of all Hungarian casualties were people younger than thirty. On the Soviet side, 699 men were killed, 1,450 wounded, and 51 missing in action. An estimated 80% of all Soviet casualties occurred in the fighting against insurgents in the eighth and ninth districts of Budapest.

Soviet perspective
Soviet reports of the events surrounding, during and after the disturbance were remarkably consistent in their accounts, more so after the Second Soviet intervention cemented support for the Soviet position among international communist parties. Pravda published an account 36 hours after the outbreak of violence that set the tone for all further reports and subsequent Soviet historiography:
 On 23 October, the honest socialist Hungarians demonstrated against mistakes made by the Rákosi and Gerő governments.
 Fascist, Hitlerite, reactionary and counter-revolutionary hooligans financed by the imperialist West took advantage of the unrest to stage a counter-revolution.
 The honest Hungarian people under Nagy appealed to Soviet (Warsaw Pact) forces stationed in Hungary to assist in restoring order.
 The Nagy government was ineffective by allowing itself to be penetrated by counter-revolutionary influences, weakening and disintegrating, as proven by Nagy's culminating denouncement of the Warsaw Pact.
 Hungarian patriots under Kádár broke with the Nagy government and formed a government of honest Hungarian revolutionary workers and peasants. The genuinely-popular government petitioned the Soviet command to help put down the counter-revolution.
 Hungarian patriots, with Soviet assistance, smashed the counter-revolution.

The first Soviet report came out 24 hours after the first Western report. Nagy's appeal to the United Nations was not reported. After Nagy was arrested outside the Yugoslav embassy, his arrest was not reported. Also, accounts failed to explain how Nagy went from patriot to traitor. The Soviet press reported calm in Budapest, but the Western press reported a revolutionary crisis was breaking out. According to the Soviet account, Hungarians never wanted a revolution at all.

In January 1957, representatives of the Soviet Union, Bulgaria, Hungary, and Romania met in Budapest to review internal developments in Hungary since the establishment of the Soviet-imposed government. A communiqué on the meeting "unanimously concluded" that Hungarian workers, with the leadership of the Kádár government and the support of the Soviet army, defeated attempts "to eliminate the socialist achievements of the Hungarian people".

The Soviet, Chinese, and Warsaw Pact governments urged Kádár to proceed with the interrogation and trial of the ministers of the Nagy government, and asked for punitive measures against the "counter-revolutionists". In addition, the Kádár government published an extensive series of "white books" (The Counter-Revolutionary Forces in the October Events in Hungary) that documented real incidents of violence against Communist Party and ÁVH members and the confessions of Nagy's supporters. The "white books" were widely distributed in several languages in most socialist countries and, while based in fact, they present factual evidence with a colouring and narrative that are not generally supported by non-Soviet-aligned historians.

Aftermath

Hungary
In the immediate aftermath, many thousands of Hungarians were arrested. Eventually, 26,000 of these were brought before the Hungarian courts, 22,000 were sentenced and imprisoned, 13,000 interned, and 229 executed. Approximately 200,000 fled Hungary as refugees. Former Hungarian Foreign Minister Géza Jeszenszky estimated 350 were executed. Sporadic resistance and strikes by workers' councils continued until mid-1957, causing economic disruption. By 1963, most political prisoners from the 1956 Hungarian Revolution had been released.

With most of Budapest under Soviet control by 8 November, Kádár became Prime Minister of the "Revolutionary Worker-Peasant Government" and General Secretary of the Hungarian Communist Party. Few Hungarians rejoined the reorganised Party, its leadership having been purged under the supervision of the Soviet Praesidium, led by Georgy Malenkov and Mikhail Suslov. Although Party membership declined from 800,000 before the uprising to 100,000 by December 1956, Kádár steadily increased his control over Hungary and neutralised dissenters. The new government attempted to enlist support by espousing popular principles of Hungarian self-determination voiced during the uprising, but Soviet troops remained. After 1956 the Soviet Union severely purged the Hungarian Army and reinstituted political indoctrination in the units that remained. In May 1957, the Soviet Union increased its troop levels in Hungary and by treaty Hungary accepted the Soviet presence on a permanent basis.

The Red Cross and the Austrian Army established refugee camps in Traiskirchen and Graz. Imre Nagy along with Georg Lukács, Géza Losonczy, and László Rajk's widow, Júlia, took refuge in the Embassy of Yugoslavia as Soviet forces overran Budapest. Despite assurances of safe passage out of Hungary by the Soviets and the Kádár government, Nagy and his group were arrested when attempting to leave the embassy on 22 November and taken to Romania. Losonczy died while on a hunger strike in prison awaiting trial when his jailers "carelessly pushed a feeding tube down his windpipe".

The remainder of the group was returned to Budapest in 1958. Nagy was executed, along with Pál Maléter and Miklós Gimes, after secret trials in June 1958. Their bodies were placed in unmarked graves in the Municipal Cemetery outside Budapest.

During the November 1956 Soviet assault on Budapest, Cardinal Mindszenty was granted political asylum at the United States embassy, where he lived for the next 15 years, refusing to leave Hungary unless the government reversed his 1949 conviction for treason. Because of poor health and a request from the Vatican, he finally left the embassy for Austria in September 1971.

Nicolas Krassó was one of the left leaders of the Hungarian uprising and member of the New Left Review editorial committee. In an interview he gave to Peter Gowan shortly before his death, Krassó summed up the meaning of the Hungarian Revolution with a recollection from Stalin's short speech in the 19th Congress of the Soviet Union in 1952: "Stalin kept silent throughout the Congress till the very end when he made a short speech that covers about two and a half printed pages. He said there were two banners that the progressive bourgeoisie had thrown away and which the working class should pick up – the banners of democracy and national independence. Certainly nobody could doubt that in 1956 the Hungarian workers raised these banners high."

International
Despite Cold War rhetoric from western countries espousing rollback of the Soviet domination of eastern Europe, and Soviet promises of socialism's imminent triumph, national leaders of this period (as well as later historians) saw the failure of the Hungarian Revolution as evidence that the Cold War had become a stalemate in Europe.

Heinrich von Brentano di Tremezzo, the Foreign Minister of West Germany, recommended that the people of Eastern Europe be discouraged from "taking dramatic action which might have disastrous consequences for themselves". The Secretary-General of NATO Paul-Henri Spaak called the Hungarian revolt "the collective suicide of a whole people". In a newspaper interview in 1957, Khrushchev commented "support by United States ... is rather in the nature of the support that the rope gives to a hanged man". 

In January 1957, United Nations Secretary-General Dag Hammarskjöld, acting in response to UN General Assembly resolutions requesting investigation and observation of the events in Soviet-occupied Hungary, established the Special Committee on the Problem of Hungary. The committee, with representatives from Australia, Ceylon (now Sri Lanka), Denmark, Tunisia and Uruguay, conducted hearings in New York, Geneva, Rome, Vienna and London. Over five months, 111 refugees were interviewed including ministers, military commanders and other officials of the Nagy government, workers, revolutionary council members, factory managers and technicians, communists and non-communists, students, writers, teachers, medical personnel, and Hungarian soldiers. Documents, newspapers, radio transcripts, photos, film footage, and other records from Hungary were also reviewed, as well as written testimony of 200 other Hungarians.

The governments of Hungary and Romania refused entry to the officials of this committee, and the government of the Soviet Union did not respond to requests for information. The 268-page Committee Report was presented to the General Assembly in June 1957, documenting the course of the uprising and Soviet intervention and concluding that "the Kádár government and Soviet occupation were in violation of the human rights of the Hungarian people". A General Assembly resolution was approved, deploring "the repression of the Hungarian people and the Soviet occupation", but no other action was taken.

The chairman of the Special Committee was Alsing Andersen, a Danish politician and leading figure of Denmark's Social Democratic Party, who had served in the Buhl government in 1942 during the Nazi German occupation of Denmark. He had defended collaboration with the occupation forces and denounced the resistance.  The Committee Report and the motives of its authors were criticised by the delegations to the United Nations from the Soviet Union and Kádár government. The Hungarian representative disagreed with the report's conclusions, accusing it of falsifying the events, and argued that the establishment of the committee was illegal. The committee was accused of being hostile to Hungary and its social system. An article in the Soviet journal "International Affairs", published by the Foreign Affairs Ministry, carried an article in 1957 in which it denounced the report as a "collection of falsehoods and distortions".

Time named the Hungarian Freedom Fighter its Man of the Year for 1956. The accompanying Time article comments that this choice could not have been anticipated until the explosive events of the revolution, almost at the end of 1956. The magazine cover and accompanying text displayed an artist's depiction of a Hungarian freedom fighter, and used pseudonyms for the three participants whose stories are the subject of the article. In 2006, Hungarian Prime Minister Ferenc Gyurcsány referred to this famous Time cover as "the faces of free Hungary" in a speech marking the 50th anniversary of the uprising. Mr Gyurcsány (in a joint appearance with British Prime Minister Tony Blair) commented "It is an idealised image but the faces of the figures are really the face of the revolutionaries".

At the 1956 Summer Olympics in Melbourne, the Soviet handling of the Hungarian uprising led to a boycott by Spain, the Netherlands, and Switzerland. A confrontation between Soviet and Hungarian teams occurred in the semi-final match of the water polo tournament on 6 December. The match was extremely violent, and was halted in the final minute to quell fighting among spectators. This match, now known as the "blood in the water match", became the subject of several films. The Hungarian team won the game 4–0 and later was awarded the Olympic gold medal. Norway declined an invitation to the inaugural Bandy World Championship in 1957, citing the presence of a team from the Soviet Union as the reason.

On Sunday, January 6, 1957, as millions of Americans watched Ed Sullivan's popular television variety show, with the nearly 22 year-old Elvis Presley headlining for the third time, Sullivan told viewers Presley felt "so keenly about Hungarian relief, he urges all of us through the country to remember that immediate aid is needed."  The host followed this with Elvis singing an unrecorded number, the gospel song "Peace in the Valley," saying "he feels that this is sort of in the mood that he'd like to create." By the end of 1957, these contributions, distributed by the Geneva-based International Red Cross as food rations, clothing and other essentials, had amounted to some CHF 26 million (US$6 million in 1957 dollars), the equivalent of $ in today's dollars. On 1 March 2011, István Tarlós, the mayor of Budapest, made Presley an honorary citizen posthumously, and a plaza located at the intersection of two of the city's most important avenues was named after Presley as a gesture of gratitude.

Meanwhile, as the 1950s drew to a close the events in Hungary produced fractures within the Communist political parties of Western European countries. The Italian Communist Party (PCI) suffered a split. According to the official newspaper of the PCI, l'Unità, most ordinary members and the Party leadership, including Palmiro Togliatti and Giorgio Napolitano, supported the actions of the Soviet Union in suppressing the uprising. However, Giuseppe Di Vittorio, chief of the communist trade union CGIL, spoke out against the leadership's position, as did prominent party members Antonio Giolitti, Loris Fortuna, and many others influential in the Communist Party. Pietro Nenni of the Italian Socialist Party, a close ally of the PCI, opposed the Soviet intervention as well. Napolitano, elected in 2006 as President of the Italian Republic, wrote in his 2005 political autobiography that he regretted his justification of Soviet action in Hungary, stating at the time he believed that party unity and the leadership of Soviet Communism was more important.

The Communist Party of Great Britain (CPGB) suffered the loss of thousands of party members following the events in Hungary. Though Peter Fryer, correspondent for the CPGB newspaper The Daily Worker, reported on the violent suppression of the uprising, his dispatches were heavily censored by the party leadership. Upon his return from Hungary Fryer resigned from the paper. He was later expelled by the Communist Party.

In France, moderate communists, such as historian Emmanuel Le Roy Ladurie, resigned, questioning the French Communist Party's policy of supporting Soviet actions. The French philosopher and writer Albert Camus wrote an open letter, The Blood of the Hungarians, criticising the West's lack of action. Even Jean-Paul Sartre, still a determined Communist, criticised the Soviets in his article Le Fantôme de Staline, in Situations VII. Left communists were particularly supportive of the revolution.

The Chinese Communist Party (CCP) viewed the events of the revolution in context of its concern with the Soviet de-Stalinization of 1956 and the sort of problems along the lines of the Eastern European uprisings that China might eventually have to face. Mao Zedong cited the repressions in Hungary as a lesson: "You forbid people to strike, to petition, or to make unfavorable comments, you simply resort to repression in every case, until one day you become a Rákosi." Later, as the CCP leadership became concerned with the degree of criticism from the lower levels of the party and from outside of the party during the Hundred Flowers campaign, Mao again cited the Hungarian revolution, describing China as at risk of a "Hungarian Incident" if it did not win this "major battle".

Commemoration

In the north-west corner of MacArthur Park in Los Angeles, California, the Hungarian-American community built a commemorative statue to honour the Hungarian freedom fighters. Built in the late 1960s, the obelisk statue stands with an American eagle watching over the city of Los Angeles. There are several monuments dedicated to the Commemoration of the Hungarian Revolution throughout the United States. One such monument may be found in Cleveland, Ohio, at the Cardinal Mindszenty Plaza. There is also a monument of A Boy From Pest in the town of Szczecin, Poland. Denver has Hungarian Freedom Park, named in 1968 to commemorate the uprising.

Public discussion about the revolution was suppressed in Hungary for more than 30 years. Since the thaw of the 1980s, it has been a subject of intense study and debate. At the inauguration of the Third Hungarian Republic in 1989, 23 October was declared a national holiday.

On 16 June 1989, at the 31st commemoration of his execution, Imre Nagy's body was reburied with full honours. The Republic of Hungary was declared in 1989 on the 33rd anniversary of the Revolution, and 23 October is now a Hungarian national holiday.

In December 1991, the preamble of the treaties signed with the dismembered Soviet Union, under Mikhail Gorbachev, and Russia, represented by Boris Yeltsin, officially apologised for the Soviet actions of 1956 in Hungary. Yeltsin made the apology in person during a 1992 speech to the Hungarian Parliament.

On 13 February 2006, the U.S. State Department commemorated the fiftieth anniversary of the 1956 Hungarian Revolution. U.S. Secretary of State Condoleezza Rice commented on the contributions made by 1956 Hungarian refugees to the United States and other host countries, as well as the role of Hungary in providing refuge to East Germans during the 1989 protests against communist rule. U.S. President George W. Bush also visited Hungary on 22 June 2006 to commemorate the fiftieth anniversary.

See also

 "Avanti ragazzi di Buda", an Italian song about the Hungarian Revolution of 1956
 Cultural representations of the Hungarian Revolution of 1956
 Children of Glory (2006)
 House of Terror museum in Budapest
 East German uprising of 1953
 Foreign interventions by the Soviet Union
 List of conflicts related to the Cold War
 Anti-Rightist Campaign
 Quỳnh Lưu uprising 
 1956 Georgian demonstrations 
 Poznań protests of 1956
 Prague Spring (1968)
 Proletarian internationalism
 Romanian anti-communist resistance movement
 Significant events of the Hungarian Revolution of 1956
 "Blood in the Water" match at the 1956 Melbourne Olympics
 Tankie

Notes

References

Further reading

 
 
 
 
 
 
 
 
 Matthews, John P.C. (2007). Explosion: The Hungarian Revolution of 1956  New York: Hippocrene, 
 
 
 
 Schmidl, Erwin A. & Ritter, László. (2006) The Hungarian Revolution, 1956; Osprey Elite series #148. 
 
 
 Watry, David M. ( 2014). Diplomacy at the Brink: Eisenhower, Churchill, and Eden in the Cold War. Baton Rouge: Louisiana State University Press

Historiography and memory
 Cash, John Joseph. "Commemoration and Contestation of the 1956 Revolution in Hungary". Comparative Hungarian Cultural Studies (2011): 247–258.
 Cox, Terry. Hungary 1956 – forty Years On (London: F. Cass, 1997)
 Csipke, Zoltán. "The changing significance of the 1956 revolution in post-communist Hungary". Europe-Asia Studies 63.1 (2011): 99–128 phttps://is.muni.cz/el/fss/podzim2019/MVZb2091/um/Memory1956.pdf Online].
 Erőss, Ágnes. "'In memory of victims': Monument and counter-monument in Liberty Square, Budapest". Hungarian Geographical Bulletin 65.3 (2016): 237–254. Online
 Gyáni, Gábor. "Memory and discourse on the 1956 Hungarian revolution". Europe-Asia Studies 58.8 (2006): 1199–1208.
 Gyáni, Gábor. "Revolution, uprising, civil war: the conceptual dilemmas of 1956". European Review of History – Revue européenne d'histoire. 15.5 (2008): 519–531. Online
 Heller, Ágnes, and Ferenc Fehér. Hungary 1956 Revisited: The Message of a Revolution-a Quarter of a Century After (George Allen and Unwin, 1983).
 Mark, James. "Antifascism, the 1956 Revolution and the politics of communist autobiographies in Hungary 1944–2000". Europe-Asia Studies 58.8 (2006): 1209–1240. Online
 Nyyssönen, Heino, and Jussi Metsälä. "Building on legacy and tradition: commemorations of 1956 in Hungary". National Identities 21.4 (2019): 379–393. Online

Primary sources
 Beke, Laszlo. A Student's Diary: Budapest, October 16 – November 1, 1956 (NY: Macmillan, 1957).
 
 Granville, Johanna (1999) In the Line of Fire: New Archival Evidence on the Soviet Intervention in Hungary, 1956, Carl Beck Paper, no. 1307 (1999). 
 Haraszti-Taylor, Eva, ed. The Hungarian Revolution of 1956: A Collection of Documents from the British Foreign Office (Nottingham: Astra Press, 1995).
 Korda, Michael. Journey to a Revolution: A Personal Memoir and History of the Hungarian Revolution of 1956. Harper Perennial (2006). 
 Lasky, Melvin J. The Hungarian Revolution; a White Book: The Story of the October Uprising As Recorded in Documents, Dispatches, Eye-Witness Accounts, and World-Wide Reactions (Books for Libraries Press, 1970).
 Lomax, William, ed. Hungarian Workers' Councils in 1956 (East European Monographs, 1990).
 Nagy, Imre. On Communism: In Defense of the New Course (Praeger, 1957).
 
 United Nations: Report of the Special Committee on the Problem of Hungary, General Assembly, Official Records, Eleventh Session, Supplement No. 18 (A/3592), New York, 1957

External links
 Ürményházi, Attila J.(2006) "The Hungarian Revolution-Uprising, Budapest 1956"

Historical collections
 1956 Hungarian Revolution Collection of the Woodrow Wilson International Center for Scholars, Cold War International History Project, containing documents and other source materials relating to the 1956 Revolution.
 Institute of Revolutionary History, Hungary A Hungarian language site providing historical photos and documents, books and reviews, and links to English language sites.
 OSA Digital Archive Videos of the 1956 Hungarian Revolution
 Universal Pictures and Warner Pathé newsreels regarding the revolution
 "On this day 4 November 1956: Soviet troops overrun Hungary" (Accessed 12 October 2006) – BBC reports on the first day of the second Soviet intervention and the fall of the Nagy government.
 Hungarian Revolution of 1956 Archive at marxists.org
 Hungary '56 Andy Anderson's pamphlet, written in 1964 and originally published by Solidarity (UK), about events of the Hungarian uprising of 1956, focusing on Hungarian demands for economic and political self-management. (AK Press 2002)

Other academic sources
 The 1956 Hungarian revolution and the Soviet bloc countries: reactions and repercussions (MEK)
 Hungary, 1956: Reviving the Debate over U.S. (In)action during the Revolution, published by the National Security Archive

Feature films
 The Beast of Budapest, a 1958 American film
 Freedom's Fury The 2005 documentary film depicting events surrounding the Hungarian–Soviet confrontation in the Olympic water polo tournament, now known as the "blood in the water match". Narrated by Mark Spitz, produced by Lucy Liu and Quentin Tarantino.
 Torn from the flag Documentary film 2007. The significant global effects of the Hungarian revolution of 1956.
 Freedom Dance Multi award-winning animated documentary produced by Steven Thomas Fischer and Craig Herron. The film retells the escape of Edward and Judy Hilbert from Communist Hungary during the Hungarian Revolution of 1956. The film is narrated by Golden Globe-winning actress Mariska Hargitay.
 The Unburied Man Drama film on the life of Imre Nagy.

Commemorations
 The 1956 Portal – a resource for Hungarian-American organizations to highlight and promote their 1956 Hungarian Revolution commemoration activities, including 1956 photos, videos, resources, and events across the United States
 Freedom Fighter 56 – personal stories of survival and escape from participants in the revolution
 1956 Hungarian Memorial Oral History Project – multicultural Canada oral history collection of revolution refugees in Canada
 From the noon bell to the lads of Pest

 
1950s conflicts
1950s in Budapest
1956 in international relations
20th-century revolutions
Anti-communism in Hungary
Articles containing video clips
Cold War military history of the Soviet Union
Cold War rebellions
Communism-based civil wars
Communism in Hungary
Conflicts in 1956
Eastern Bloc
Hungarian People's Republic
Hungary–Soviet Union relations
Invasions by the Soviet Union
Massacres in Hungary
November 1956 events in Europe
October 1956 events in Europe
Protests in Hungary
Revolutions in Hungary
Soviet military occupations
Urban warfare
Wars involving Hungary
Wars involving the Soviet Union